Ardisia alstonii is a species of plant in the family Primulaceae. It is endemic to Panama. It is threatened by habitat loss.

References

alstonii
Endemic flora of Panama
Vulnerable plants
Taxonomy articles created by Polbot